Viktor Andreyevich Kolyadko (born 28 July 1957) is a Russian professional football coach and a former player.

Honours
Soviet Top League champion: 1987.

External links
 

1957 births
Living people
Soviet footballers
Russian footballers
FC Akhmat Grozny players
PFC CSKA Moscow players
SC Odesa players
FC Dnipro players
FC Spartak Moscow players
FC Metalurh Zaporizhzhia players
MŠK Žilina players
Soviet Top League players
Soviet expatriate footballers
Russian expatriate footballers
Expatriate footballers in Czechoslovakia
Russian football managers
Association football forwards